Emily Howland (November 20, 1827 – June 29, 1929) was a philanthropist and educator.  Especially known for her activities and interest in the education of African-Americans, she was also a strong supporter of women's rights and the temperance movement.  Howland personally financed the education of many black students and contributed to institutions such as the Tuskegee Institute.

Early life and education
Emily Howland was born at Sherwood, Cayuga County, New York, on November 20, 1827. She was the daughter of Slocum and Hannah Tallcot Howland, who were prominent in the Society of Friends. Her brother, William Howland, served in the 106th New York State Legislature. She was educated in small private schools in the community, and the Margaret Robinson School, a Friends school in Philadelphia, Pennsylvania.

Career
An active abolitionist, Howland taught at Normal School for Colored Girls (now University of the District of Columbia) in Washington, D.C., from 1857 to 1859. During the Civil War she worked at the contraband refugee settlement of Camp Todd in Arlington, Virginia, teaching freed slaves to read and write as well as administering to the sick during a smallpox outbreak and ultimately serving as director of the camp during 1864-1866.

Beginning in 1867, she started a community for freed people in Heathsville, Northumberland County, Virginia, called Arcadia, on 400 acres purchased by her father, including a school for the education of children of freed slaves, the Howland Chapel School. She continued to maintain an active interest in African-American education, donating money and materials as well as visiting and corresponding with administrators at many schools. Returning to Sherwood NY after her father's death in 1881, she inherited $50,000 ($ in  dollars) and ran the Sherwood Select School until 1926 when it became a public school and was renamed the Emily Howland Elementary School by the state of New York.

Howland was also active in women's suffrage, peace, and temperance movements and was a member of the Woman's Christian Temperance Union. In 1858, she began organizing women's rights lectures and meetings with  Susan B. Anthony and Elizabeth Cady Stanton. In 1878, she spoke at the 30th anniversary of the Seneca Falls woman's rights convention and in 1894 the New York State legislature. When the suffrage movement split into two groups, the National Woman Suffrage Association and the American Woman Suffrage Association, Howland did not take sides, but attended meetings of both groups. In 1904, she spoke in front of Congress and attended the 1912 and 1913 suffrage parades in New York. She has been credited with persuading Ezra Cornell that, as a Quaker, he should make Cornell University a coeducational institution.

In 1926 she received an honorary Litt.D. degree from the University of the State of NY, in Albany, the first woman to have this honor conferred upon her from this institution. She was also the author of an historical sketch of early Quaker history in Cayuga County, NY: Historical Sketch of Friends in Cayuga County.

Howland became one of the first female directors of a national bank in the United States, at the First National Bank of Aurora in Aurora, New York, in 1890, serving until her death, at age 101.

Legacy
Her papers are held by several universities, including Cornell University, Haverford College, and Swarthmore College. A photo album containing family, friends, and colleagues, as well as souvenir images of notable abolitionists and famous figures during the 1860s and 1870s is jointly owned by the National Museum of African American History and Culture and the Library of Congress. In 2021, she was inducted into the National Women's Hall of Fame.

External links
 The World of Emily Howland: Odyssey of a Humanitarian, by Judith Colucci Breault (1976)
 Emily Howland Family Papers held at Friends Historical Library of Swarthmore College
 Emily Howland family photographs held at Friends Historical Library of Swarthmore College
 Emily Howland papers held at Haverford College Quaker & Special Collections
Much of Emily Howland’s papers have been digitized and are available at the In Her Own Right project

References

1827 births
1929 deaths
Activists from New York (state)
American abolitionists
American anti-war activists
American centenarians
American Quakers
American suffragists
American temperance activists
American women educators
Educators from New York (state)
People from Aurora, Cayuga County, New York
People of Washington, D.C., in the American Civil War
Philanthropists from New York (state)
Quaker abolitionists
Women centenarians
Women civil rights activists
Women in the American Civil War